Tiburon (Spanish Tiburón, "shark") may refer to:

Places
United States
 Tiburon, California
 Tiburón Golf Club Naples, Florida
 Tiburon Peninsula (California), a peninsula in the San Francisco Bay Area of California
Mexico
 Tiburón Island, an island in the Gulf of California
Haiti
 Tiburon Peninsula, Haiti
 Tiburon, Sud, commune in Haiti
Denmark
 Thyborøn, a fishing village on the west coast of Jutland

Arts
 Tiburon, a 1935 prize winning first novel about the people of the eponymous town by Kylie Tennant
 El Tiburón, a single by Proyecto Uno. Also covered by Henry Mendez
"Tiburón" (Rubén Blades song), by Willie Colón and Rubén Blades

Others
 Hyundai Tiburon, a car built by the Hyundai Motor Company
 Hoyt Tiburon, a take-down recurve bow built by Hoyt Archery
 USS Tiburon (SS-529)
 ROV Tiburon, a deep-sea research robot of the R/V Western Flyer
 EA Tiburon, an Electronic Arts studio in Orlando, Florida; developer of the Madden NFL series of video games
 A planet and a city in the Star Trek series
 A fictional town in South Carolina in The Secret Life of Bees (novel)
 A fictional town based on Canowindra, NSW described by Kylie Tennant in her eponymous first novel.
 A fictional character in the game Assassin's Creed IV: Black Flag

See also
Tibouren, French wine grape often misspelled as Tiburon